Enongo Lumumba-Kasongo (born March 20, 1986), known as Sammus, often stylized as SΔMMUS,  is an American underground rapper, former teacher, and record producer.

Early life 
Enongo Lumumba-Kasongo was born in Rhinebeck, NY to an Ivorian mother and Congolese father. (Patrice Lumumba, former Prime Minister of Congo, was her great uncle.) Her parents, both professors, moved her family to Ithaca, NY at an early age, her mother teaching at Cornell University and her father at Wells College.

She began producing music in highschool under the name DJ Eno, first using the PlayStation program MTV Music Generator, and the digital audio workstation Reason to create beats. When she was trying to pick a new name for herself, a friend recommended the name Samus, after the main character of the Metroid series of games, since both are women in male dominated genres.

Education 
Sammus received a BA degree from Cornell University in 2008, double majoring in Science and technology studies and Sociology. She then worked full-time as teacher, in Houston, Texas for Teach for America. Sammus then returned to Cornell in Fall 2011 to pursue an MA degree and doctorate in Science and Technology Studies, which she obtained in 2015 and 2019, respectively.

In 2019, Sammus was awarded a two-year Postdoctoral Fellowship in Music at the Cogut Institute for the Humanities at Brown University, focusing on the aesthetics and techniques of music of the African diaspora. Currently, she serves as Mellon Gateway Postdoctoral Fellow and Assistant Professor in the Brown University Department of Music.

Music 
Sammus' influences started with her older brother Disashi (currently a member of Gym Class Heroes), who exposed her both to video games and alternative rock bands like Weezer and Nirvana.  In addition, Sammus has stated that she has been heavily influenced by Kanye West, particularly his debut album The College Dropout:

Sammus released her debut EP Fly Nerd in 2010.  She followed up with the album M'Other Brain in 2012. After Mega Ran was exposed to Sammus' music, the two began collaborating.  In 2013, within a few hours of releasing her second album, Prime, it became the bestselling rap album on Bandcamp. In December 2013, Sammus launched a Kickstarter campaign for her fourth album, a concept album based on Metroid. This album, Another M earned her fans of the nerdcore subgenre. In various interviews and social media, Sammus has clarified that she doesn't identify herself as a nerdcore rapper, and instead prefers the term "Afrofuturism" to refer to her video-game centered music because it requires an engagement with her Blackness.

Performances 
Sammus has toured the U.S. with Mega Ran on the Rappers with Arm Cannons tour in 2015.  She has performed at the SXSW Music Festival since 2015, the Penny Arcade Expo (PAX East) in 2015, Geek Girl Con in 2014 and 2015 with plans to return in 2016. She has also performed at the east coast's music and gaming festival, MAGfest, in 2015 and 2016.  In June 2017 she performed at McCarren park in Greenpoint Brooklyn as part of the Northside Festival.

Discography 
 2010 - Fly Nerd (EP, self-released)
 2012 - M'Other Brain (NuBlack Music Group)
 2012 - Reset: Instrumentals (self-released)
 2013 - Prime (NuBlack Music Group)
 2013 -  Nerdcore Instrumentals: Castlevania Edition (with DJ Cutman)
 2013 - Castlevania: The Nocturnal Cantata (Joypad Records)
 2014 - Another M (NuBlack Music Group)
 2014 - Nerdcore Instrumentals 2 (with DJ Cutman)
 2016 - InFusion (EP, NuBlack Music Group)
 2016 - Pieces in Space (Don Giovanni Records)

References

External links 
 Official Website
 Sammus at Don Giovanni Records
 Sammus on Genius

1986 births
Living people
American hip hop musicians
Cornell University alumni
American women rappers
African-American women rappers
Nerdcore artists
Musicians from Ithaca, New York
Rappers from New York (state)
Teach For America alumni
21st-century American rappers
21st-century American women musicians
Educators from New York City
21st-century African-American women
21st-century African-American musicians
20th-century African-American people
20th-century African-American women
Don Giovanni Records artists
Ithaca High School (Ithaca, New York) alumni
21st-century women rappers